WXLX (103.7 FM) is a radio station licensed to Lajas, Puerto Rico, the station serves the Puerto Rico area.  The station is currently owned by Radio X Broadcasting Corporation.

History
The station went on the air as WCFI on 1995-06-16. It is remembered for its "Radio Cofresi" moniker. on 1999-04-01 the station changed its call sign to the current WXLX.

References

External links
 

XLX
Radio stations established in 1995
Lajas, Puerto Rico
1995 establishments in Puerto Rico